George Whitehorne (died 1565) was a Canon of Windsor from 1559 to 1565.

Career

He was appointed:
Minor Canon and Priest-Vicar of St George's Chapel, Windsor Castle 1541 - 1565
Vicar of Ruislip until 1554, returned 1559.

He was appointed to the sixth stall in St George's Chapel, Windsor Castle in 1559 and held the canonry until 1565.

Notes 

1565 deaths
Canons of Windsor
Year of birth unknown